The Front Comtois is a French small political group, located in France, in the region Franche-Comté. Its ideologies include racism, islamophobia, antisemitism, historical revisionism, homophobia, opposition to the legalization of abortion and neo-nazism. It was created in 2008. Members degraded a mosque with blood and a pig's head and racist inscriptions. Now Front Comtois has between 30 and 100 members, and often demonstrate in Montbéliard, Belfort and Besançon and many other small cities. The organisation was condemned and fined in 2011 for incitement to racial and religious hatred, at 6400 euros of penalty.

References

Far-right political parties in France
Political parties established in 2008
Politics of Franche-Comté
Identitarian movement in France